Tony Dekker is a Canadian singer and songwriter. Most noted as leader of the indie folk band Great Lake Swimmers, he has also released two solo albums.

Early life and education 
Born and raised in Wainfleet, Ontario, Dekker studied literature at the University of Western Ontario.

Career 
Dekker recorded his band's first two albums, Great Lake Swimmers and Bodies and Minds, in Wainfleet, in an abandoned grain silo and a Catholic church, respectively. By the time of the band's third album Ongiara, Dekker and the band were based in Toronto full time. In 2008, Dekker composed the score for Song Sung Blue, a documentary film.

In addition to his work with Great Lake Swimmers, Dekker released his debut solo album Prayer of the Woods in 2013. He followed up in 2014 with Tony Dekker Sings 10 Years of Zunior, an album of covers of other Canadian artists, including Old Man Luedecke, Chad VanGaalen, Christine Fellows, Ohbijou, Rae Spoon, Matt Mays, Martin Tielli, Jennifer Castle and Cadence Weapon.

References 

Canadian folk rock musicians
Canadian folk-pop singers
Canadian rock singers
Canadian songwriters
Canadian folk guitarists
Canadian people of Dutch descent
Indie folk musicians
Musicians from the Regional Municipality of Niagara
Living people
University of Western Ontario alumni
Year of birth missing (living people)
Great Lake Swimmers members
21st-century Canadian male singers